Presbyterian Church Parsonage is a historic Presbyterian church parsonage at 15 E. Cherry in Flagstaff, Arizona.

It was built in a Queen Anne style and was added to the National Register in 1986.

References

Presbyterian churches in Arizona
Properties of religious function on the National Register of Historic Places in Arizona
Queen Anne architecture in Arizona
Churches completed in 1893
Churches in Coconino County, Arizona
Clergy houses in the United States
National Register of Historic Places in Flagstaff, Arizona